A giant's kettle, also known as either a giant's cauldron, moulin pothole, or glacial pothole, is a typically large and cylindrical pothole drilled in solid rock underlying a glacier either by water descending down a deep moulin or by gravel rotating in the bed of subglacial meltwater stream.

The interiors of potholes tend to be smooth and regular, unlike a plunge pool. An example is the large pothole found in Archbald, Pennsylvania, in Archbald Pothole State Park.

Formation

Giant's kettles are formed while a bedrock surface is covered by a glacier. Water, produced by the thawing of the ice and snow, forms streams on the surface of the glacier, which, having gathered into their courses a certain amount of morainic debris, finally flow down a crevasse as a swirling cascade or moulin. The sides of the crevasse are abraded, and a vertical shaft is formed in the ice. The erosion may be continued into the bed of the glacier. After the ice departed the area, the giant's kettle formed as an empty shaft, or as a pipe filled with gravel, sand, or boulders. Such cavities and pipes afford valuable evidence as to the former extent of glaciers.

Similar potholes are encountered in riverbeds and the Channeled Scablands scoured by glacial outburst floods.

Notable giant's kettle

They are also common in Germany (gletschertopf; glacier pot), Sweden (jättegryta), Finland (hiidenkirnu; hiisi's churn), and Moss Island in the United States.

See also
Pothole (disambiguation)
Sinkhole

References

External links

Glaciology
Fluvial landforms